Todd Woodbridge was the defending champion but lost in the second round to Sandon Stolle.

Jason Stoltenberg won in the final 7–6(7–4), 2–6, 7–5 against Chris Woodruff.

Seeds

  Mark Woodforde (second round)
  Todd Woodbridge (second round)
  Magnus Gustafsson (semifinals)
  Javier Frana (semifinals)
  Karim Alami (first round)
  Félix Mantilla (second round)
  Jason Stoltenberg (champion)
  Fernando Meligeni (first round)

Draw

Finals

Top half

Bottom half

References
 1996 America's Red Clay Court Championships Draw

1996
1996 ATP Tour